The Madonna of Humility is a tempera-on-panel painting by the  Italian late medieval artist Gentile da Fabriano, dating from around  1420-1423 and housed in the Museo nazionale di San Matteo, Pisa.

The work, once in the local Pious House of Misericordy, was commissioned in unknown circumstances, although its size suggests that it was destined to private devotion. It was perhaps ordered by cardinal Alemanno Adimari, archbishop of Pisa, who had his sepulchre in  the Roman church of Santa Maria Nova decorated by Gentile (a lost work mentioned by late Renaissance art biographer Giorgio Vasari).

Description
The Madonna of Humility, with the Virgin sitting on a cushion over the ground, was a common theme in early 15th century western  painting. She is holding the Child on her knees, above a richly decorated gilt cloth. The fine golden background, the rendering of the clothes and other technical detail link the panel to the artist's Florentine period, including works such as the Adoration of the Magi (1423)  and (in particular for the posture of the Child) the Adoration of the Child.

A work with the same composition was executed by Gentile da Fabriano in 1420-1421, although in it the Virgin is portrayed frontally.

The mantle of the Virgin has on the border the inscription "AVE M[A]T[ER] DIEGNA [D]EI", while on the edge of the cloth on which the Child lies are Arabic characters, which have been read as the Quran Shahada (لا إله إلا الله - Lā ilāha illa Allāh). The presence of such an element has not been explained, and it could be an exotic addition made without knowing the exact meaning of the original verse.

Sources

Paintings of the Madonna and Child by Gentile da Fabriano
1420s paintings
Paintings in the collection of the Museo Nazionale di San Matteo